Organ theft is the forcible removal of a person's organs to be used as transplants and sold in black market. While some cases of organ theft are urban legends, others have been found to be true. It is also a commonly used trope in science fiction.

Urban legends 
Recorded rumors of the theft of one or both of the victims kidneys have existed since 1994. According to American folklorist Jan Harold Brunvand, it is possible that the story originated due to a news story wherein a Turkish man, Ahmet Koc, claimed to have had his kidney stolen at a hospital but had in fact sold his kidney and was unhappy at the amount of money he had been paid.

There is certainly a worldwide organ trafficking issue, but actual organ theft is highly unlikely. American skeptical investigator Benjamin Radford notes that organ transplantation is extremely complicated, requires specific matches coupled with fairly tight time frames, and highly specialized medical training. As such, Radford wrote that common variations on the legend where either a lone traveler is drugged or otherwise subdued or where a child is kidnapped and harvested against their will are simply not possible scenarios for such theft to occur.

Suspected occurrences
There are cases that to varying degrees are suspected of being real occurrences. They generally occur in institutional settings with the systems and expertise available for the transplantation of organs to occur.

India
The multi-billion rupee Gurgaon kidney scandal came to light in January 2008 when police arrested several people for running a kidney transplant racket in Gurgaon, an industrial township near New Delhi, India. Kidneys from most of the victims, who were poor people from the nearby Uttar Pradesh, were transplanted into clients from the United States, United Kingdom, Canada, Saudi Arabia and Greece. The police raid was prompted by complaints by the locals from Moradabad about illegal kidney sales. The man accused of the scandal, Amit Kumar, was arrested in Nepal on 7 February 2008 and has denied any hand in criminal activity. According to the Gurgaon police, the scandal at a local clinic was going on for six to seven years. The donors were lured with offerings of about ₹30,000 for kidney removal. First, they were lured to the clinic on the pretext of job opportunities. They were instead asked for donating their kidneys for the fee and all those who resisted were drugged against their will and subsequently operated upon.

Kosovo

Organ theft in Kosovo has been widely reported.

During and after the 1999 war, accusations were made of people being killed in order to remove their organs to sell them on the black market. Various sources estimated that the number of victims ranged from a "handful", up to 50, between 24 to 100 to over 300. The victims were believed to be of Serbian nationality, killed by perpetrators with strong links to the Kosovo Liberation Army (UÇK) in 1999. Claims were investigated first by the ICTY, who found medical equipment and traces of blood in and around the house. They were then investigated by the UN, who received witness reports from many former UÇK fighters who stated that several of the prisoners had their organs removed.

In 2010, a report by Swiss prosecutor Dick Marty to the Council of Europe (CoE) uncovered "credible, convergent indications" of an illegal trade in human organs going back over a decade, including the deaths of a "handful" of Serb captives killed for this purpose. On 25 January 2011, the report was endorsed by the CoE, which called for a full and serious investigation. Since the issuance of the report, however, senior sources in the European Union Rule of Law Mission in Kosovo (EULEX) and many members of the European Parliament have expressed serious doubts regarding the report and its foundations, believing Marty failed to provide "any evidence" concerning the allegations. A EULEX special investigation was launched in August 2011.

Responding to this allegation, the head of the war crimes unit of Eulex (the European Law and Justice Mission in Kosovo), Matti Raatikainen, claimed "The fact is that there is no evidence whatsoever in this case, no bodies. No witnesses. All the reports and media attention to this issue have not been helpful to us. In fact, they have not been helpful to anyone." He described these allegations as a "distraction" that prevented the war crimes unit from finding the remains of close to 2,000 individuals of Serb, Albanian, and Roma ethnicity still missing in the conflict.

China

Allegations of forced organ harvesting from Falun Gong practitioners and other political prisoners in China have raised concern within the international community. According to a controversial report by former lawmaker David Kilgour, human rights lawyer David Matas and journalist Ethan Gutmann of the US government think tank Victims of Communism Memorial Foundation, political prisoners, mainly Falun Gong practitioners, are being executed "on demand" in order to provide organs for transplant to recipients. There have been claims that organ harvesting has taken place both as a result of the Chinese Communist Party's persecution of Falun Gong and because of the financial incentives available to the institutions and individuals involved in the trade. Research undertaken by the Washington Post has cast doubt on these allegations, with experts interviewed by the Post stating that China does not import sufficient quantities of immunosuppressant drugs, used by transplant recipients, to carry out the alleged organ harvesting.

Organ prices 
List of average organ prices on the black market.

In science fiction 
Organ theft is a common trope in science fiction, being popularized by the Known Space universe created by Larry Niven, where it is called "organlegging", a portmanteau of "organ" and "bootlegging". Due to organ transplantation becoming safe and universally effective, a huge potential black market in body parts was able to be exploited by murderous racketeers.

Literary critic John Kenneth Muir cited the Vidiians, from TV series Star Trek: Voyager, as an example of the prevalence of organ harvesting story arcs in science fiction, comparing them to similar ideas explored in earlier British television shows such as UFO, Space: 1999, and in the episode "Powerplay" in the third series of Blake's 7. He speculated that there may be a connection between these science fiction storylines and the spread of organ trafficking urban legends.  Other academics have made similar observations that the Vidiians and other science fiction depictions of organ harvesting have the potential to adversely influence public knowledge and perceptions of scientific issues, including genetics and organ donation. Clarence Spiger and colleagues, in a study of student perceptions of organ donations, highlighted the Vidiians as an example of a problematic source of information about the topic on television, a medium which many participants had identified as a key source for their understanding. "We can only speculate", they wrote, "that students' responses could have been indirectly or subconsciously influenced through the viewing of such programming."  Emily Russell, in exploring the way embalming and other techniques are used to make death appear lifelike, notes that "the conceptual groundwork is laid for organ transfer as the 'gift of life' [and thus] organ 'harvesting' then becomes not the dystopic vision of science fiction, but a celebrated and natural transfer of life from death."

See also
 Charlie the Unicorn, a 2005 short viral video
 Coma, 1977 novel by Robin Cook
 Coma, 1978 film, based on the aforementioned novel
 Death Warrant, 1990 film, where a murder mystery involves organ theft where healthy prison inmates are murdered for healthy organs
 Fleisch, a 1979 German made-for-television film in which a newly married man is abducted by organ traffickers in the American Southwest
 Organ procurement
 Organ harvesting
 Pound of Flesh, a 2015 film in which a former commando falls prey to organ thieves
 Turistas, a 2006 American horror film, in which the main characters who are tourists are abducted in the Brazilian countryside for purposes of organ theft
 Snakehead, a 2007 Alex Rider novel in which the title character is kidnapped and sent to a facility for organ theft in the South East Asian jungle

References

Organ transplantation
Science fiction themes
Urban legends